Alex Wyndham  (born 1 January 1981) is an English actor, known for his role as Gaius Maecenas in the HBO television series Rome (2007).

Biography
He was educated at Winchester College and has a degree in history from the University of Oxford where he appeared in a number of student plays. During his studies he did a lot of stage performance, including touring Japan with an OUDS production of Love's Labours Lost. He then trained at the Royal Academy of Dramatic Art (RADA), graduating in 2005. Wyndham augmented his formal education by completing programmes such as: a camera acting course at BBC Elstree Centre; earning the BASSC Certificate 1st class (distinction) armed and unarmed combat; and achieving the level of black belt (1st Dan) Shotokan Karate. He has many skills including period and Flamenco dancing, and sings baritone. His special interests include: athletics, films, travel, guitar and graphic design.

His first job as a professional actor was playing Silvius in Kenneth Branagh's adaptation of As You Like It while he was still at drama school. His other credits include an appearance in T4's girl-band soap Totally Frank as Ben, The Line of Beauty and Little Dorrit. He also appeared in the BBC World War One medical drama The Crimson Field.
He narrates the historical romance novels of Bliss Bennet (The Penningtons) and Stella Riley (The Rockcliffe series and The Roundheads and Cavaliers series).

Works

Film

Television

Video Games

References

External links
 Finch and Partners – Agent
 HBO Rome Official Site
 Royal Academy of Dramatic Art

1981 births
Living people
Alumni of RADA
Alumni of the University of Oxford
English male film actors
English male stage actors
English male television actors
English male voice actors
English male Shakespearean actors
People educated at Winchester College
Actors from Winchester
21st-century English male actors